Bupyeong station is a subway station located in Bupyeong District, a district in Incheon, South Korea. This station is on the Seoul Subway Line 1 and Incheon Subway Line 1. It is one of the most crowded stations on the Incheon line because of its central location and its connection to the Seoul line.

Entrance
 Exit 1: Bupyeong 6-dong Office, Yerim School, Bupyeong Catholic Medical Center
 Exit 2: Bupyeong Elementary School, Buil Girls' Middle School, Bupyeong 2-dong Office
 Exit 3: Police branch office at Bupyeong Station

Underground market
The station is connected with an underground passage, consisting of small shops that sell various types of goods, including clothes, accessories, electronic devices and books. Many of these goods can be purchased cheaper than standard retail establishments. In addition, the station building has a Uniqlo store, food court, retail shops, various restaurants and a large Lotte Mart store.

Passengers
According to data, the number of passengers traveling via this station has greatly decreased over the past few years. This is believed to be caused by the deployment of Metropolitan City buses.

In popular culture
The station has appeared several times in the widely popular South Korean film My Sassy Girl.

Gallery

References

Seoul Metropolitan Subway stations
Railway stations opened in 1899
Metro stations in Incheon
Bupyeong District
1899 establishments in Korea
Incheon Subway Line 1